Mirosławiec  is a town in Wałcz County, West Pomeranian Voivodeship, Poland, with 4,837 inhabitants (2007).

Mirosławiec is a former private town, once located in the Poznań Voivodeship of the Crown of the Kingdom of Poland.

People
 Knobelsdorff, German Wiki (ca.14th) noble family, founders of Märkisch Friedland
 Akiva Eiger (1761-1837) Rabbi in Märkisch Friedland 1791 until 1815 
 Philipp Phoebus (1804–1880), German physician and pharmacologist
 Benjamin Liebermann (1812-1901), German textile manufacturer
 Heinrich von Friedberg (1813–1895), German jurist and statesman
 Joseph Abraham Stargardt (1822–1885), German businessman
 Julius Wolff (1836–1902), German surgeon
 Fedor Krause (1857-1937) German Neurosurgeon,

See also
Friedland
Mirosławiec air accident

References

External links
Official town webpage

Cities and towns in West Pomeranian Voivodeship
Wałcz County